In statistics, marginal models (Heagerty & Zeger, 2000) are a technique for obtaining regression estimates in multilevel modeling, also called hierarchical linear models.
People often want to know the effect of a predictor/explanatory variable X, on a response variable Y. One way to get an estimate for such effects is through regression analysis.

Why the name marginal model?
In a typical multilevel model, there are level 1 & 2 residuals (R and U variables). The two variables form a joint distribution for the response variable. In a marginal model, we collapse over the level 1 & 2 residuals and thus marginalize (see also conditional probability) the joint distribution into a univariate normal distribution. We then fit the marginal model to data.

For example, for the following hierarchical model,

Thus, the marginal model is,

This model is what is used to fit to data in order to get regression estimates.

References
Heagerty, P. J., & Zeger, S. L. (2000). Marginalized multilevel models and likelihood inference. Statistical Science, 15(1), 1-26.

Regression models